Babulal Nagar (बाबूलाल नागर) is an Indian politician formerly with the Indian National Congress party. He was a former minister in the Government of Rajasthan.  Nagar was elected to Rajasthan Legislative Assembly in 2008 from Dudu in Jaipur district on the Congress ticket. Under chief minister Ashok Gehlot, Nagar was appointed as the Dairy, Khadi and Rural Industries Minister. He resigned in September 2013 under pressure from the chief minister and women's groups, and he was expelled from the Congress Party a few days later.

Criminal allegations
Babulal Nagar was cleared of rape charges brought in 2013 by a 35-year-old woman who had alleged that Nagar called her to his official residence on the pretext of giving her a government job and then raped her. Nagar had indicated at the time charges were brought that they were politically motivated; after his acquittal, he reiterated that it was all a political conspiracy, and demanded a CBI investigation.

Notes and references

People from Jaipur district
Rajasthani politicians
Rajasthan MLAs 2008–2013
Indian National Congress politicians
Living people
Crime in Rajasthan
1960 births
Indian National Congress politicians from Rajasthan